A clamp holder or clamp fastener is a piece of laboratory apparatus that is used to secure laboratory clamps, such as extension-type utility clamps, or other attachments to a retort stand or lab frame. The material can be made up of brass, cast iron, stainless steel, aluminium or nickel-plated zinc.

Operation
A retort stand rod and clamp are inserted into two jaws of a clamp holder and adjustable thumbscrews fasten the clamp holder to the attachments and lock it in place. The attachments can be secured with the thumbscrews to be positioned at any height or angle, with a regular clamp holder positioning the apparatus at a 90° angle.

Uses

Clamp holders can secure laboratory equipment at specific angles, diameters, and weights, as required. Clamp holders are often used to hold the attached apparatus over a work surface. There are several different types of holders, such as swivel holders and all-position holders, that allow adjustments for different angles and planes. In some cases it can be used to attach support rods together.

Additional images

See also
 Retort Stand
 Utility Clamp
 Iron Ring

References

Laboratory equipment